A View through Three of the North-Western Arches of the Third Storey of the Coliseum is a painting by the Danish painter C. W. Eckersberg. It was painted in 1815 or 1816 when Eckersberg sojourned in Rome, painting a series of works of the ancient ruins of the city.

The details of the ruins are precisely observed as they appear at the site in Rome. The views of the city, however, are a construction as Eckersberg connected three separate views to create a new harmony. The Royal Engraving Collection has two sketches Eckersberg did to plan his work.
 
An example of Danish Golden Age painting, the work was included in a Danish canon on art.

References

Further reading
  Kasper Monrad: "Udsigt gennem tre buer – Dansk-tyske kunstnermøder i Danmark, Tyskland og Italien", in William Gelius and Stig Miss (eds.): Under samme himmel – Land og by i dansk og tysk kunst 1800-1850, Thorvaldsens Museum, Copenhagen 2000

1810s paintings
Paintings by Christoffer Wilhelm Eckersberg
Paintings in the collection of the National Gallery of Denmark
19th-century paintings in Denmark
Architecture paintings
Images of Rome